Bolgatanga (Frafra: Bɔlegataŋa), colloquially known as Bolga, is a town and the capital of the Bolgatanga Municipal District and Upper East Region of Ghana, adjacent to the border with Burkina Faso. Bolgatanga has over 2012 settlement and a population of about 66,685 people. Bolgatanga is 161 km (about 100 miles) to the north of Tamale.  Bolgatanga lies in the Red Volta River Valley (which serves as a major migration route of elephants), with the White Volta River and the cliffs of the Gambaga Escarpment to the south of the town forming the southern boundary of the Upper East Region.

History of Bolgatanga

The name Bolgatanga (Bolbatanga) was derived from the Guresi words bolba "migrants" and tanŋa "pyramid." Historically Bolgatanga was situated at the southern terminus of the ancient Trans-Saharan trade route. The eastern route converged with the Sahelian route, near Bolgatanga. Along the route, handicrafts—especially straw baskets, hats and fans, as well as leather goods, metal jewelry, and indigenous attires — were exchanged for kola nuts and salt. The Upper East Region, where Bolgatanga lies, is part of what used to be known as the Upper Region. Between 1902 and 1960 the Northern Territory was a British protectorate; it was separated into the Northern and Upper Region on July 1, 1960. The Upper Region was apportioned into Upper East and Upper West Region in 1983.

The inhabitants of Bolgatanga migrated from Yoa a community in the Kasena Nankana east municipal. Tanzui The Apoka biisi's of Bukere a community in Bolgatanga were led by Apoka Kariyane.

Communities in Bolgatanga - Atulbabiisi, Dagweom, Bukere, Soe, Yarigabiisi, Zuarungi, Poaliko, Tindaamoligo, Gumbiisi Zongo, Zongo.

Transportation

There is public transportation from Bolgatanga to major cities such as Accra, Kumasi, Mim, Ahafo, Cape Coast, Sunyani, Tamale, Tema, Ho, Wa,  Elubo, Aflao, and Techiman.

Life in Bolgatanga

Bolgatanga is known as the crafts centre of the Upper East Region, with a large central market. Apart from items found elsewhere in the Upper East Region, the so-called "Bolga hats" are made and sold in Bolgatanga. Bolgatanga and its surrounding suburbs also comprise the largest producers of leather goods, straw baskets, and smocks. The artists sell their works at the Bolgatanga Market, which is open every third day. There is also a museum in the town, which houses objects of historical importance of the Upper East Region.

Climate
Bolgatanga has a hot semi-arid climate (Köppen climate classification BSh).

Occupation & food 
Farming is the main occupation of the people of Bolga. They engage in subsistence farming of millet, maize, guinea-corn, rice, beans, groundnuts, and sweet potatoes during the rainy season and irrigation farming of onions, tomatoes, and peppers during the dry season. almost  every farmer rears at least a bird or animal.

The main food of the people of Bolga is Tuo Zaafi (TZ) made with millet, corn, or Guinea millet flour with leaf soup (beto), rice porridge.

Tourism

Architecture and sights of Bolgatanga

Schools in Bolgatanga 
 Bolgatanga Senior High School (mixed)
 Bolgatanga Nursing Training College (mixed)
 Bolgatanga Midwifery College 
 Bolgatanga Technical Institute
 Bolgatanga Girls' Senior High School (Girls)
 Zamse Senior High School (mixed)
 Zuarungu Senior High School (mixed)
 Zuarungu Nursing Training College
 Bolgatanga Polytechnic

Bolgatanga Library
The Bolgatanga Library is a notable design of award-winning American architect J. Max Bond, Jr., who was influenced by Le Corbusier. Bond lived in Ghana for four years in the 1960s. The Bolgatanga library was his first major project while working for the national construction company. The design features perforated walls and an "umbrella"-shaped roof, so the structure remains cool and well ventilated.

Paga crocodile ponds

Forty kilometers (about 25 miles) from Bolgatanga, is Paga, home to the sacred crocodile ponds. These are purportedly the "friendliest" crocodiles in Ghana, and it is said that the souls of the royal family reside in them. The crocodiles roam freely throughout the ponds, and it is unthinkable that anyone should harm them.

Bolgatanga Craft Village 
Is an art center that  showcase and sell woven baskets, smocks, hats, bags, leather works (bags, sandals), local and foreign beads, figurine dolls, sculptures, ceramics( bowls), local drums, art work from Mali, Nigeria and many other art works

It was constructed in 2003 by the municipal assembly to promote the cultural heritage of Ghana and Africa.

References

External links 
 Ghana-pedia website – Bolgatanga
 Culture and tourism: Upper East in focus.
 

Regional capitals in Ghana
Populated places in the Upper East Region